Paul Sephton Higham (born 20 August 1990) is an English former first-class cricketer.

Higham was born at Hammersmith in August 1990. He was educated at Poole Grammar School, before going up to Pembroke College, Oxford. While studying at Oxford, he made a single appearance in first-class cricket for Oxford University against Cambridge University in The University Match of 2011 at Fenner's. Playing as a right-arm medium pace bowler, Higham took 3 wickets for 36 runs in the Cambridge second innings, having bowled sixteen wicketless overs in their first innings which conceded 40 runs. He batted twice in the match, ending the Oxford first innings unbeaten without scoring at number eleven, while in their second innings he was dismissed for 14 runs by Frankie Brown. Higham later studied for his master's at Imperial College London.

References

External links

1990 births
Living people
People from Hammersmith
People educated at Poole Grammar School
Alumni of Pembroke College, Oxford
English cricketers
Oxford University cricketers
Alumni of Imperial College London